Challagariga is a village in Hanamkonda district, Telangana, in the state of Telangana in India.

Villages in Hanamkonda district